Katharine Wagner (born May 11, 1964) is an American television personality and Hollywood reporter. She is best known for her 2002–2004 stint as the hostess for TV Guide Channel.

Early life

Wagner was born in Los Angeles, California. Her parents are actress Marion Marshall and actor Robert Wagner, who divorced in 1971.

On her mother's side she has two older half-brothers, Joshua Donen and Peter Donen. On her father's side, she has a younger half-sister, Courtney Wagner. She has a stepsister, Natasha Gregson Wagner, from her father's marriage to Natalie Wood. Her stepmother is Jill St. John. Wood was her stepmother from July 1972 until her death on November 29, 1981.

Wagner graduated from Beverly Hills High School in 1982 and attended Santa Barbara City College for a semester. After dropping out of college, she dabbled in modeling, which allowed her to live in Tokyo and London. She received a break in 1987 when she and her father were featured on the TV show Born Famous, when the show's host asked her what she hoped to do for a living, and she answered, "I would like to do what you do."

Career
Wagner's first media job was for the Don Mischer special M & W on ABC, for which she interviewed Dan Aykroyd and his wife, Donna Dixon. This resulted in a two-and-a-half-year run at the Movietime Cable Network (Now E! Network). She went on to work at HBO, Cinemax, V, and MTV. At MTV, she guest-hosted from both coasts. She also co-hosted Awake on the Wildside, filled in for Chris Connelly on The Big Picture, and introduced videos at night.

For two years, she co-hosted an international entertainment show called Hollywood Report with Richard Jobson on ITV in Great Britain. The show was seen in 11 countries. Wagner then co-hosted 22 episodes of Live From the House of Blues on TBS.

She joined Robin Leach for the final two seasons of Lifestyles of the Rich and Famous as co host and contributing reporter. She was asked to narrate and co-produce Intimate Portrait: Natalie Wood, about her late stepmother. With the permission and cooperation of her family, Wagner shared private details of Wood's life for the first time.

In 1999, she began working for the TV Guide Channel. Her hosting duties included Music News, TV Talk, Family Do's and Don'ts, and What's On. In 2004, after 5½ years, she left the TV Guide Channel to do her own show. Later that year, she played a news reporter in the Charmed episode, "Styx Feet Under" and was a guest star on the talk show, Good Day Live.

In 2005, Wagner was host of the WB show, The Starlet. She currently hosts an online radio show with psychic medium "Voxx" at The JOINT Studios called Inner View with Katie & Voxx.

Personal life
Wagner dated Julian Lennon, Dweezil Zappa, Richard Grieco, and Steve Jones, and had a broken engagement with William Berretta.

On September 21, 2006, she gave birth to her only child, Riley John Wagner-Lewis. She married her boyfriend, Leif Lewis, in July 2007.

References

External links
 
 Katie Wagner, breastcancer.org; accessed September 5, 2017.

American women journalists
Living people
1964 births
Television personalities from Los Angeles
American women television personalities
American people of German descent
American people of Norwegian descent
Beverly Hills High School alumni
Journalists from California
21st-century American women